In the 2020–21 season, Al Sadd SC is competing in the Qatar Stars League for the 48th season, as well as the Emir of Qatar Cup and the Champions League.

Squad list
Players and squad numbers last updated on 3 September 2020.Note: Flags indicate national team as has been defined under FIFA eligibility rules. Players may hold more than one non-FIFA nationality.

Competitions

Overview

{| class="wikitable" style="text-align: center"
|-
!rowspan=2|Competition
!colspan=8|Record
!rowspan=2|Started round
!rowspan=2|Final position / round
!rowspan=2|First match	
!rowspan=2|Last match
|-
!
!
!
!
!
!
!
!
|-
| Qatar Stars League

| Matchday 1
|  style="background:gold;"|Winner
| 3 September 2020
| 9 April 2021
|-
| 2020 Emir of Qatar Cup

| Semi-finals
| style="background:gold;"| Winner
| 31 October 2020
| 18 December 2020
|-
| 2021 Emir of Qatar Cup

| Round of 16
| Semi-finals
| 26 January 2021
| 7 May 2021
|-
| Qatar Crown Prince Cup

| Semi-finals
| style="background:gold;"| Winner
| 18 February 2021
| 26 February 2021
|-
| 2020 Champions League

| Group stage
| Round of 16
| 15 September 2020
| 27 September 2020
|-
| 2021 Champions League

| colspan=2| Group stage
| 14 April 2021
| 29 April 2021
|-
! Total

Qatar Stars League

League table

Results summary

Results by round

Matches

2020 Emir of Qatar Cup

2021 Emir of Qatar Cup

Qatar Cup (ex) Crown Prince Cup

2020 AFC Champions League

Group stage

Group D

Knockout stage

Round of 16

2021 AFC Champions League

Group stage

On 11 March 2021, AFC confirmed the hosts for the group stage, except for Group H and I whose hosts will be decided at a later date. On 10 May 2021, AFC confirmed the hosts for Group H and I.

Group D

Squad information

Playing statistics

|-

|-
! colspan=16 style=background:#dcdcdc; text-align:center| Players transferred out during the season

Goalscorers
Includes all competitive matches. The list is sorted alphabetically by surname when total goals are equal.

Assists

Transfers

In

Out

Notes

References

Al Sadd SC seasons
Qatari football clubs 2020–21 season